Florin Nanu (born 9 August 1983) is a Romanian professional footballer who plays as a left midfielder for Liga III club ACS Dumbrăvița.

Club career
Nanu made his Liga I debut playing for ACS Poli Timișoara on 19 July 2013 in a match against Dinamo București.

References

External links
 Official ACS Poli profile 

People from Lugoj
Living people
1983 births
Romanian footballers
Association football midfielders
CSM Reșița players
ACS Poli Timișoara players
FC Ripensia Timișoara players
CSC Dumbrăvița players
Liga I players
Liga II players
Liga III players